John C. Mack (born December 7, 1976) is an American artist, author, photographer, and founder of Life Calling. In 2021 Mack founded Life Calling, a not-for-profit organization aimed at helping society to live fulfilled lives in the digital age while retaining our humanity and personal autonomy. This is achieved through a diverse set of tools and activities, including, but not limited to, awareness campaigns, education, art, lectures, and programming. Among the initiatives is A Species Between Worlds: Our Nature, Our Screens (2022), an interactive photography exhibition that questions how a balance between our connection to nature and today’s growing device-dependence might be attained.

Early career
Mack earned his undergraduate degree from Duke University. In 2000, Mack served as production assistant in Antarctica on the IMAX film The Endurance: Shackleton's Legendary Antarctic Expedition, and began shooting photography shortly thereafter. In 2002 he moved to Mexico to work, leading to his 2005 collaboration with Susanne Steines as co-author and photographer of the book Xibalbá: Lost Dreams of the Mexican Rainforest.

Life Calling Initiative 
In late 2021, Mack founded the Life Calling Initiative, a not-for-profit organization focused on responding to our increasing reliance on technology in the Digital Age, and the various challenges this reliance presents to humanity. The organization’s fundamental mission is 'preserving our humanity in the digital age' by developing educational strategies to best avert these dangers.

Advisory Board members include video game creator Richard Garriott, artistic director Shai Baitel, artistic director and executive director of Fairplay Josh Golin, Economist Prof. Nouriel Roubini, Emmy Award-winning producer Richard Wiese, scholar of new media, art, and design Jacek Kolasinski, and development specialist Elizabeth Manko, among others.

Among the initial projects of the Life Calling Initiative is A Species Between Worlds, a month-long interactive immersive exhibition of artworks by John Mack in New York City in September 2022. The Initiative will publish a series of books, essays, and poetry exploring this thematic realm.

A Species Between Worlds 
Speaking at CODAworx’s 2021 CODAsummit in Scottsdale, Arizona, Mack announced the launching of his new immersive art exhibition A Species Between Worlds: Our Nature, Our Screens.

A Species Between Worlds is a gamified meditation examining the intersection of humanity and technology. Mack was inspired by the Pokémon Go craze and YouTube footage which captured a 'Pokémon stampede' in Taipei in 2016, described by Mack as a ‘mass migration of humanity’.

Mack states that “The exhibition is an invitation to contemplate our relationship to our devices and the surrounding world while inspiring the introspection needed to prevent the loss of our humanity.”

Using AR artwork from Pokémon GO spliced with his own photography, Mack seeks to highlight what he coined the “Inverse Universe,” at the GLEX Summit 2022  a dimension, he states, where “truth becomes illusion, illusion becomes truth; the digital becomes the physical and the physical becomes digital. Simply put, what interests me is intelligent life chasing nothing.”

Mack spent the last 5 years taking photographs of the 7 wonders of the natural world as well as over 50 national parks in order to put together the exhibition. Spanning more than 17,000 square feet, the exhibition features more than 65 artworks and a customized app which guides visitors through a gamified psychological exploration framed by the artifice of the Pokémon Go interface.

The exhibition included a program of talks and events featuring Facebook whistleblower Frances Haugen; a conversation with Yuval Noah Harari, author of Sapiens: A Brief History of Humankind; a panel hosted by Stanford University Professors Rob Reich, Jeremey Weinstein and Mehran Sahami to discuss their book, System Error: Where Big Tech Went Wrong and How We Can Reboot; a panel on the State of Social Media featuring NYU’s Jonathan Haidt, Center for Humane Technology’s Tristan Harris, NYC school commissioner David Banks, and much more.

The exhibition is open to the public free of charge throughout September 2022 in New York City.

Revealing Mexico
Revealing Mexico (2010) was released in October 2010 and exhibited in Rockefeller Center’s Channel Gardens, New York, from October 25-31st 2010.

Mack photographed everyday life in the country for its celebrations of 2010, both the bicentennial anniversary of Mexico's independence from Spain and the centennial anniversary of the Mexican Revolution.  In addition to the anniversary, given the emphasis in the international press on ongoing violence between the state and narcoterrorism, a need existed to depict a more balanced and holistic impression of the country.

The book includes roughly 175 black and white photographs encompassing each of the 31 states and features portraits of individuals from all facets of Mexican society, including writers Carlos Fuentes and Jorge Volpi; business icons such as Carlos Slim; the artists Leonora Carrington, Gustavo Pérez, and Betsabeé Romero; academics Enrique Krauze, Denise Dresser, and Carlos Monsiváis; the actors Ignacio López Tarso and Edith González.

Net proceeds of the book were donated to the Sociedad Internacional de Valores de Arte Mexicano (SIVAM).

Other Works 
At Their Home: Marseille (2018): A collection of black and white street photography in the port city of Marseille, France.

Personal life
Mack currently resides in Sevilla, Spain.

Publications
Patient (A John Mack Photo Essay). New York: New York Presbyterian Hospital, 2004.
Xibalbá, Lost Dreams of the Mexican Rainforest/Los Sueños Perdidos de la Selva Lacandona.
Mexico City, Mexico: MVS, 2005.
Mexico City, Mexico: MVS, 2008. Second edition.
Revealing Mexico. Brooklyn, NY: powerHouse, 2010.  . Photographs by Mack, text by Susanne Steines. With a prologue by Teresa del Conde and an interview with Carlos Fuentes.
At Their Home Marseille. Brooklyn, NY: powerHouse, 2018. . Photographs by Mack.

Media Appearances 

 Mack appeared on Charlie Rose in 2010 to discuss his book of photographs and interviews with people of Mexico, Revealing Mexico.

Accolades 

 In March, 2022 Mack was named as one of fifty people 'changing the world who the world needs to know about' by The Explorers Club.
 Mack received third prize in the category of Photography at the 25th Annual New York Book Show for Revealing Mexico.

Representation 
Mack's photography is represented by the Robert Mann Gallery in New York City.

Notes

External links
 

1976 births
Living people
Duke University alumni
American photographers